Perthshire North is a constituency of the Scottish Parliament (Holyrood)  covering part of the council area of Perth and Kinross. It elects one Member of the Scottish Parliament (MSP) by the plurality (first past the post) method of election. It is one of nine constituencies in the Mid Scotland and Fife electoral region, which elects seven additional members, in addition to the nine constituency MSPs, to produce a form of proportional representation for the region as a whole.

The constituency was created for thee 2011 Scottish Parliament election, and comprises areas that were formerly part of the constituencies of Angus, Perth and North Tayside, which were abolished. Since first created it has been held by John Swinney of the Scottish National Party, who was previously the member for North Tayside.

Electoral region 

The other eight constituencies of the Mid Scotland and Fife region are Clackmannanshire and Dunblane, Cowdenbeath, Dunfermline, Kirkcaldy, Mid Fife and Glenrothes, North East Fife, Perthshire South and Kinross-shire and Stirling.

The region covers all of the Clackmannanshire council area, all of the Fife council area, all of the Perth and Kinross council area and all of the Stirling council area.

Constituency boundaries and council area 

Perth and Kinross is represented in the Scottish Parliament by two constituencies, Perthshire North and Perthshire South and Kinross-shire, which together cover the entire council area.

When the Scottish Parliament was established constituency boundaries were the same as the pre-existing Westminster (House of Commons) constituencies, and consequently Perth and Kinross was spread across four constituencies:  Angus, North Tayside, Ochil and Perth. In 2005 Scottish Westminster constituencies were mostly replaced with new constituencies whilst Scottish Parliament constituencies were left unchanged for the 2007 election. Scottish Parliament constituencies were reviewed ahead of the 2011 Scottish Parliament election and the existing constituencies covering Perth and Kinross were abolished, leading to the current situation.

Perthshire North covers the northern part of Perth and Kinross, including part of the City of Perth, and the towns of Aberfeldy, Blairgowrie and Rattray, Coupar Angus, Dunkeld, Pitlochry and Scone. The electoral wards used in Perthshire North are listed below. All of these wards are part of Perth and Kinross:

Carse of Gowrie
Strathmore
Blairgowrie and Glens
Highland
Strathtay
Perth City Centre

Member of the Scottish Parliament

Election results

2020s

2010s

References

External links

Scottish Parliament constituencies and regions from 2011
Politics of Perth and Kinross
Constituencies of the Scottish Parliament
Constituencies established in 2011
2011 establishments in Scotland
Politics of Perth, Scotland
Blairgowrie and Rattray
Coupar Angus
Pitlochry
Aberfeldy, Perth and Kinross